The All India Momin Conference, commonly abbreviated as Momin Conference and also known as Jamaat-ul-Ansar, is a political party that was founded in India in 1911. It was formed to articulate the interests of the Momin Ansari community. In particular, the All India Momin Conference "aimed to revive the traditional crafts of weavers, promote self-respect and devout religious conduct among the weavers and restore their independent status."

The Momin Conference "saw itself as articulating the interests of ordinary Muslims" as opposed to the "Muslim League, the latter being perceived a party of eite Muslims". In 1940, the All India Momin Conference passed a resolution in Patna that opposed the partition of India. It said: “the Partition scheme was not only impracticable and unpatriotic but altogether un-Islamic and unnatural, because the geographical position of the different provinces of India and the intermingled population of the Hindus and Muslims are against the proposal and because the two communities have been living together for centuries, and they have many things in common between them.”

The All India Momin Conference was a member at the All India Azad Muslim Conference, which opposed the creation of Pakistan.

See also 
All India Azad Muslim Conference

References

1911 establishments in India
Political parties established in 1911
Political parties in India